Sailors Three (released in the US as Three Cockeyed Sailors) is a 1940 British war comedy film directed by Walter Forde and starring Tommy Trinder, Claude Hulbert and Carla Lehmann. This was cockney music hall comedian  Trinder's debut for Ealing, the studio with which he was to become most closely associated. It concerns three British sailors who accidentally find themselves aboard a German ship during the Second World War.

Detailed surveys published in Britain in the early years of the war by the "Mass-Observation" organisation, showed the popularity of comedy with wartime cinema audiences. Films with the war as a subject were particularly well received, especially those movies showing the lighter side of service life, largely because many in the audience would soon be finding themselves in uniform. John Oliver writes in BFI screenonline, " to prepare such potential recruits for their own possible riotous and fun-packed life in the Royal Navy, Sandy Powell had already taken the shilling in All At Sea (dir. Herbert Smith, 1939) before Tommy Trinder did likewise with Sailors Three, following his comic misadventures in the army in Laugh It Off (dir. John Baxter) earlier that same year."

The song "All Over The Place" (words by Frank Eyton; music by Noel Gay), sung by Trinder in the film, became one of the most popular of the war.

Plot
During the Second World War, three Royal Navy sailors on a drunken spree in a Brazilian neutral port mistake a German ship for their own and climb aboard. It turns out to be a pocket battleship, the Ludendorff, and to the credit of the Royal Navy, the trio manages to capture the ship and all the Germans on board.

Cast
 Tommy Trinder as Tommy Taylor
 Claude Hulbert as Llewellyn Davies, 'The Admiral'
 Carla Lehmann as Jane Davies
 Michael Wilding as Johnny Meadows
 James Hayter as Hans Muller
 Jeanne de Casalis as Mrs Pilkington
 Henry Hewitt as Professor Pilkington
 Brian Fitzpatrick as Digby Pilkington
 John Laurie as McNab
 Harold Warrender as Pilot's Mate
 Eric Clavering as Bartender
 John Glyn-Jones as Best Man
 John Wengraf as German Captain
 Manning Whiley as German Commander
 Victor Fairley as German Petty Officer
 Alec Clunes as British Pilot
 Derek Elphinstone as British Observer
 E.V.H. Emmett as Newsreel Commentator (uncredited)

Critical response
 TV Guide called it "a funny comedy from the propagandistic Ealing studios".
Britmovie concluded director "Walter Forde’s music-hall training enabled him to see that the gags were well-timed."
In the BFI screenonline, John Oliver writes, "Trinder may have made more distinguished films at Ealing, but Sailors Three was not only a promising start at the studio but the film that would remain his most successful outright comedy."

References

External links
 
 

1940 films
1940s war comedy films
Films directed by Walter Forde
Ealing Studios films
British war comedy films
British black-and-white films
Military humor in film
World War II films made in wartime
1940 comedy films
1940s English-language films
1940s British films